Markus Olsson (born 31 March 1990) is a Swedish handball player who plays for IFK Kristianstad and the Swedish national team.

References

External links

1990 births
Living people
Swedish male handball players
People from Karlshamn
IFK Kristianstad players
Swedish expatriate sportspeople in Denmark
Expatriate handball players
Sportspeople from Blekinge County